Vaddu Bava Thappu is a 1994 Indian Telugu-language comedy film produced by P. Purshothama Rao and C. Kalyan under the Sri Ammulya Art Productions banner and directed by K. Ajay Kumar. It stars Rajendra Prasad, Ravali, Indraja with music composed by Vidyasagar. The film is a remake of the Marathi film Kiss Bai Kiss (1988). The film was recorded as a flop at the box office.

Plot
Raja (Rajendra Prasad), a middle-classed unemployed guy meets Manju (Ravali), the daughter of wealthy man Simhachalam (A.V.S.), both of them fall in love. Due to Simhachalam not liking poor people, Raja and Manju get secretly married with the help of their common friend Satish (Raj Kumar). After the marriage, they take accommodation in Satish's bungalow. Knowing about this, Simhachalam gets a heart attack, after a slight recovery, he wants to meet his daughter and son-in-law. When he arrives at Satish's bungalow with his entire family, Satish is mistaken as his son-in-law and Raja as a servant; now Raja masquerades as a servant due to the health condition of Simhachalam. Things get really complicated day by day when Priya (Indraja), Manju's younger sister falls for Raja. The remainder of the story details how they get rid of all these problems.

Cast
Rajendra Prasad as Raja
Ravali as Manju
Indraja as Priya
Raj Kumar as Satish
A.V.S. as Simhachalam
Babu Mohan
Sivaji Raja 
Nagaraju as Shankar
Gundu Hanumantha Rao
Chitti Babu
Irogleg sastry
Madhu Sri
Y. Vijaya

Soundtrack

Music composed by Vidyasagar. Music released on Supreme Music Company.

Other
 VCDs and DVDs on - SHALIMAR Video Company, Hyderabad

References

1990s Telugu-language films
Films scored by Vidyasagar
Indian comedy films
Telugu remakes of Marathi films
1995 comedy films
1995 films